Allium chienchuanense is a plant species endemic to the Province of Yunnan in southern China. It grows on stream banks at elevations of about 3100 m.

Allium chienchuanense produces bulbs up to 3 cm in diameter. Scape is up to 80 cm long, round in cross-section. Umbel is spherical with many yellow flowers.

References

chienchuanense
Onions
Flora of China
Flora of Yunnan
Plants described in 1980